Dong'an County is a county of Hunan Province, China, it is under the administration of Yongzhou prefecture-level City.

Located on the south central margin of the province, it is adjacent to the eastern border of Guangxi. The county is bordered to the north by Shaoyang County, to the east by Lengshuitan District, to the south by Lingling District, Quanzhou County of Guangxi, to the west and the northwest by Xinning County. The county has 13 towns and 2 townships under its jurisdiction, the county seat is Baiyashi.

Dong'an County is the source place of Dong'an Chicken, which is one of well-known  Hunan foods.

Administrative divisions
13 towns
 Baiyashi
 Damiaokou
 Dasheng
 Duanqiaopu
 Hengtang
 Huaqiao
 Jingtouyu
 Luhongshi
 Lumaqiao
 Nanqiao
 Shiqishi
 Xinyujiang
 Zixishi

2 townships
 Shuiling
 Shuiyan

Climate

References
www.xzqh.org

External links 

 
County-level divisions of Hunan
Yongzhou